Railway stations in Angola include:

Towns served by rail

North line (Luanda Railway) (CFL) 
(Also known as Luanda Railway) (originally 1000 mm gauge, now 1067 mm gauge)
 Luanda – port – national capital; junction
 Bungo (0 km) Start of Duplication.
 Caxito – branch terminus; provincial capital
 Quicabo
 Funda 
 Cabiri – branch terminus
 Sambizanga
 Rangel
 Cazenga – workshops
 Viana (23 km) – suburban station; stadium
 (junction)
 Baía Farta branch terminus; end of duplication
 Camizunzo 
 Catete
 Zenza do Itombe – junction
 Dondo – branch terminus
 Quixinge – branch extension
 Beira Alta (Angola, Cuanza Norte)
 Canhoca – junction
 Cambondo – branch terminus
 N'dalatando
 Cacuso
 Lombe
 Malanje (479 km) – terminus
 Golungo Alto – branch terminus

 Musseques – first passenger halt from port
 Filda
 Grafanil
 Estagem
 Comarca
 Viana
 Pomagol

 Bungo
 Texatang
 Boa Vista

 Cazenga – workshops

 Luinha – short branch

 Luanda
 Barra do Dande proposed new port

Middle line 
(610mm gauge = closed)

 Porto Amboim – port
 Gabela – terminus at mine

Central line (Benguela Railway) (CFB) 
(all 1067 mm gauge)

 Lobito – port and terminus
 Catumbela – junction of original route (now Benguela branch) with 1948 deviation
 Benguela – port, terminus of branch line since 1948
 Catengue – on steeply graded section of original route which was bypassed and abandoned in 1948
 Caimbambo – end of 1948 deviation
 Cubal – 171 km
 Ganda
 Caála – junction of Cuima branch
 Huambo – (380 km) (was Nova Lisboa) – workshops
 Chinguar
 Kuito 
 Camacupa
 Cuemba
 Chicala
 Luena
 Luacano junction for proposed short cut rail line to Zambian copper mines
 Luau – (1269 km) – border with DRCongo
 Dilolo, Congo Kinshasa

 Cavaco River

 Caála – junction
 Cuima – branch terminus, line formerly continued to a mine at the Cunhangamua river

 Benguela line junction
 Proposed short cut line due 2012
  Benguela Railway (CFB) 
  Luacano junction to Zambia
   Jimbe border checkpoint 
  Chingola, Zambia – railhead

South Line (Moçâmedes Railway) (CFM)
(originally  gauge, converted to  gauge in the 1950s.)

 Moçâmedes – port
 Sacomar – (~5 km) – marshalling yards
 Bibala 
 Lubango (246 km) – junction

 Maquelo,
 Laceiras, 
 Micose,
 Cabanas,
 Kapunda,
 Kuvango (Huíla),
 Tombolo,
 Vembambi,
 Viungue
 Kuelei.

 Matala – intermediate station
 Dongo – (500 km) – junction
 Dongo Novo
 Entroncamento
 Cubango
 Cuchi 
 Menongue – terminus (756 km)

 Caraculo – concrete sleeper plant in 2008

 Lubango – junction
 Chibia – yards
 Chiange – branch terminus (150 km) which may be extended to link with Namibia.
 Cuvelai
 Ondjiva – provincial capital

 Dongo – junction
 Cassinga – iron ore
 Chamutete – branch terminus in far south

 Cuto
 
 (Unknown location)
 Namialo – concrete sleeper plant.

Proposed

Northern 

 Integrated Railway System would build the following:
 Luanda through the provinces of Bengo, Uíge, Zaire and Cabinda 
  Luena
  Luau
  Matadi
  junction with Matadi-Kinshasa Railway
 includes road-rail Matadi Bridge over Congo River in  Democratic Republic of the Congo
  Cabinda Province exclave
  Pointe Noire- Brazzaville.

Central North 

 Malanje
 Kuito

Central (Benguela line) 

  Luacano, Moxico province east junction
 Short cut line due 2012; current route via DR Congo
  Lumwana line
  Solwezi new mining town
  Chingola
  Zambia

Central South 

 Kuito
 Dondo

Southern 
 Dongo – junction
 Chamutete railhead in south; also spelled Tchamutete.
 Cuvelai
 Ondjiva – provincial capital
 Namacunde

 Cassinga
 Cuvango 
  Santa-Clara, Angola – near border with Namibia
  Oshikango, Namibia – (Angola-Namibia border)
 Ondangwa railhead in north of Namibia

 Matala October 2009
 Lubango – junction

See also 
 Railway stations in Congo Brazzaville
 Railway stations in Congo Kinshasa
 Transport in Angola
 Railway stations in Namibia

References 

 
Railways